Joppe may refer to :

 Jaffa, known as Joppa alias Ioppe, an Ancient city and former bishopric, now also
 Joppe (Roman), Latin Catholic titular see
 Joppe (Syrian), Syriac Catholic titular see
 Joppe, Gelderland, Netherlands

See also
 Joppa (disambiguation)